The Bagan Datuk District is the most southwest district in Perak, Malaysia. It covers an area of 951 square kilometres, and had a population about of 70,300. The district is bordered by Perak River which separates Manjung and Central Perak in the north, Bernam River which separates Sabak Bernam in the state of Selangor in the south, Muallim and Hilir Perak in the northeast. The capital of this district is Bagan Datuk town. Other localities that are situated in the district include Hutan Melintang, Rungkup and a planned township known as the “Bagan Datuk Water City (BDWC)”. Bagan Datuk is well known for the largest source of coconuts in Perak.

History
Bagan Datuk was founded initially at a different site at Batu 11/2 at Kampung Pasang Api. The current area where Bagan Datuk lies was previously referred to as Sungai Keling.

In January 2016, Bagan Datoh was declared an autonomous sub-district (daerah kecil) of Perak after the approval from Sultan of Perak, Menteri Besar of Perak and the state secretary. On 15 June 2016, Bagan Datoh was upgraded into a full district, detaching it from Hilir Perak (Teluk Intan). Teluk Intan however retains responsibility for the municipal works in the new district. In August 2016, Sembilan Island was incorporated to Bagan Datoh District from Manjung District.

On 29 December 2016, it was announced that Bagan Datoh will be renamed to Bagan Datuk starting 9 January 2017.

One of the renowned public education institutions in the district is Sekolah Kebangsaan Khir Johari, Sungai Sumun.

Administrative divisions

Bagan Datuk District is divided into 4 mukims, which are:
 Bagan Datuk (formerly as Bagan Datoh)
 Hutan Melintang
 Rungkup
 Teluk Bharu

The district also consist of 46 villages along with 8 Chinese fishing villages.

Demographics

Federal Parliament and State Assembly Seats 
List of Bagan Datuk district representatives in the Federal Parliament (Dewan Rakyat)

List of Bagan Datuk district representatives in the State Legislative Assembly of Perak

See also 
 Districts of Malaysia

References